Nedjeljko Mihanović (16 February 1930 – 27 January 2022) was a Croatian politician who served as Speaker of the Croatian Parliament from 1994 to 1995. He was an associate member of the Croatian Academy of Sciences and Arts (HAZU). He retired in 2000, and died on 27 January 2022, at the age of 91.

References

External links 
Biography 
 

1930 births
2022 deaths
Croatian Democratic Union politicians
Politicians from Split, Croatia
Speakers of the Croatian Parliament
Croatian literary historians
Faculty of Humanities and Social Sciences, University of Zagreb alumni